Lin Chih-han (born 14 November 1980) is a Taiwanese professional Go player.

Promotion record

Career record
2006: 42 wins, 19 losses
2007: 35 wins, 18 losses
2008: 65 wins, 27 losses
2009: 33 wins, 18 losses
2010: 47 wins, 22 losses

Titles and runners-up

References

1980 births
Living people
Taiwanese Go players
Go players at the 2010 Asian Games
Asian Games competitors for Chinese Taipei